Craugastor chac is a species of frog in the family Craugastoridae.
It is found in Belize, Guatemala, and Honduras.
Its natural habitats are subtropical or tropical moist lowland forests, subtropical or tropical moist montane forests, plantations, and heavily degraded former forest.
It is threatened by habitat loss.

References

chac
Frogs of North America
Amphibians of Central America
Amphibians of Guatemala
Near threatened fauna of North America
Amphibians described in 1987
Taxonomy articles created by Polbot